Bob or Robert Halloran may refer to:

 Bob Halloran (CBS sportscaster) (1934–2022), American sports executive and national CBS sportscaster
 Bob Halloran (ABC sportscaster), American sports announcer for ABC Boston
 Robert Halloran (1906–1936), American swimmer

See also
 Bob O'Halloran, Australian politician